The Northern Illinois Conference is an Annual Conference (regional episcopal area, similar to a diocese) of the United Methodist Church. This conference serves the northern portion of the state of Illinois, with its administrative offices and the office of the bishop being in the Chicago Temple Building in Chicago, Illinois. It is part of the North Central Jurisdictional Conference. The current bishop is Sally Dyck.

Mission

Districts 
The Northern Illinois Annual Conference is further subdivided into 6 smaller regions, called "districts", which provide further administrative functions for the operation of local churches in cooperation with each other. This structure is vital to Methodism, and is referred to as connectionalism. The Districts that comprise the Northern Illinois Conference are:
Aurora
Chicago Northwestern
Chicago Southern
Elgin
DeKalb
Rockford

Conference Boundaries

Institutions of Higher Learning 
The Northern Illinois Conference supports and is host to three institutions of higher learning:
Kendall College, Evanston, Illinois
Garrett-Evangelical Theological Seminary, Evanston, Illinois
North Central College, Naperville, Illinois.

See also
Annual Conferences of the United Methodist Church

References

External links
Northern Illinois Conference of The United Methodist Church

United Methodism by region
Illinois
Christianity in Chicago
Methodism in Illinois